Brevundimonas nasdae is a Gram-negative and aerobic bacterium from the genus of Brevundimonas which has been isolated from condensation water from the Mir.

References

Bacteria described in 2004
Caulobacterales